The Middletown United Methodist Church is a historic church at Madison and Main Streets in Middletown, Kentucky. It was added to the National Register of Historic Places in 1980.

The church was established in 1800.  The second building was built in 1899 by William Benjamin Wood, a local builder. It is a brick structure on a stone foundation.

The parish is now located in a newer building on Old Shelbyville Road.

A sign on the lawn in 2014 identified the building as the Middletown Community Center (per photo).

References

United Methodist churches in Kentucky
Churches on the National Register of Historic Places in Kentucky
Gothic Revival church buildings in Kentucky
Churches completed in 1899
19th-century Methodist church buildings in the United States
Churches in Jefferson County, Kentucky
Middletown, Kentucky
National Register of Historic Places in Jefferson County, Kentucky
19th-century buildings and structures in Louisville, Kentucky
1899 establishments in Kentucky
Community centers in Kentucky